KHCM (880 kHz) is a Chinese-Language AM radio station licensed to Honolulu, Hawaii.  It is owned by the Salem Media Group with studios on North King Street in Honolulu's Kalihi district.  

KHCM transmits with 2,000 watts, using a non-directional antenna. The transmitter is on Ahui Street on Mamala Bay in the Kakaako neighborhood.

History
The original call sign was KAIM, broadcasting on 870 kilocycles with 5,000 watts. It was owned by the Christian Broadcasting Association and had a Christian radio format.

Salem Media bought KAIM in 2000 and wanted to take the station off the air.  That would allow its sister station in Los Angeles, KRLA 870 AM, to increase its nighttime power.  At the last minute, Salem management decided to reduce KHCM's power, shift its frequency to 880 kHz and let the Honolulu station continue broadcasting.  

In 2004, Salem bought Modern Rock outlet 97.5 KPOI (FM) and flipped it to a Talk radio format, the first FM talk station in Hawaii.  KAIM 880 became its simulcast after the switch was made. On September 3, 2007, Country music outlet KHCM, also owned by Salem Media, switched from 690 AM to both 880 AM to 97.5 FM, keeping its format intact.  Salem, in turn, moved the Talk radio format and KHNR call letters to 690 AM.

On July 1, 2009, after nearly 3 years of simulcasting, KHCM 880 split from KHCM-FM 97.5.  The AM station adopted a Chinese-language format, calling itself "Radio China International." The format targets Honolulu's growing Chinese-American population in both Madarin and English.  It carries the Chinese government-sponsored China Radio International network.  In addition to the Chinese programming, KHCM also broadcasts some Japanese-language and Korean-language shows.

References

External links
FCC History Cards for KHCM
 Station Website

Chinese-American culture in Honolulu
HCM (AM)
Korean-language radio stations in the United States
Chinese-language radio stations in the United States
HCM
China Radio International
1956 establishments in Hawaii
Radio stations established in 1956
Salem Media Group properties
Korean-American culture in Hawaii